Nikolaus Karl Eduard Schmidt von der Launitz (born Nikolaus Karl Eduard Launitz; 23 November 1797 – 12 December 1869) was a German sculptor.

Biography
Launitz was born a Baltic German in Grobin, Courland, which was then part of the Russian Empire. He was raised in Vechelde in the Duchy of Brunswick in 1809 after the death of his parents. In 1815 he began studying jurisprudence at the University of Göttingen. He became more interested in art, however, and visited an artists' colony in Rome. There he became a student of Bertel Thorvaldsen, whom he assisted in restoring the Æginetan marbles.

Schmidt von der Launitz spent most of his adult life in Frankfurt. He taught at the Städel in Frankfurt and the art academy in Düsseldorf. Schmidt von der Launitz is buried in the Hauptfriedhof Frankfurt. United States sculptor Robert Eberhard Launitz was his nephew.

Work
Schmidt von der Launitz's first independent work was an 1820 relief of his brother, who had died during the Battle of Leipzig. In Frankfurt, he executed a Gutenberg monument and other notable works. For the Villa Torlonia in Rome, he made several statues, and other works of his are at the Hague.

See also 
 Johann Christian Gustav Lucae

Notes

References
 (birthyear 1796; in all other sources — 1797)

External links

1797 births
1869 deaths
People from Grobiņa
People from Courland Governorate
Baltic-German people
German sculptors
German male sculptors
Academic staff of Kunstakademie Düsseldorf
Burials at Frankfurt Main Cemetery